Don't Shoot Portland, also called Don't Shoot PDX, is a Portland, Oregon-based accountability group formed by Black Lives Matter supporter Teressa Raiford to scrutinize actions of the Portland Police Bureau.

History

Don't Shoot Portland held a march on 7 July 2016 following the police killings of two black men: Alton Sterling in Louisiana and Philando Castile in Minnesota. At the march, conservative blogger Michael Strickland pulled a gun and pointed it at protesters.  According to The Hill video showed Strickland holding what appeared to be a video camera while arguing and backing away from protesters, before drawing his weapon. Strickland, known to post YouTube videos for "Laughing at Liberals", was shepherded away from the crowd by Jessie Sponberg, a mayoral candidate, before being arrested by police.  He was later convicted of crimes relating to this incident. 

In 2021, Raiford stated that activists in Portland were focused on saving lives while city leaders were focused on saving windows. 

Don't Shoot Portland sued the Department of Homeland Security over the 2020 deployment of federal forces in Portland.

See also
 George Floyd mural
 Not My Presidents Day

References

External links

 

Advocacy groups in the United States
Organizations based in Portland, Oregon
Black Lives Matter